Capital Research Center (CRC) is an American conservative non-profit organization located in Washington, D.C. Its stated purpose is "to study non-profit organizations, with a special focus on reviving the American traditions of charity, philanthropy, and voluntarism." According to The Washington Post, it also discourages donations by corporations and non-profits supporting what it sees as liberal or anti-business policies. It monitors the giving of major liberal donors in the U.S.

History

Foundation 
CRC was founded in 1984 by Willa Johnson, former senior vice president of the Heritage Foundation, Deputy Director of the Office of Presidential Personnel in the first term of the Reagan administration, and a legislative aide in both the U.S. Senate and House of Representatives. Journalist and author Marvin Olasky previously served as a senior fellow at CRC.

In 2011, Politico reported that CRC had received millions of dollars from conservative philanthropists over the years, with a total budget in 2009 of $1.4 million. Donors have included foundations run by the Koch family, the Scaifes, and the Bradleys. As of 2017, CRC had received more than $265,000 from ExxonMobil.

David Clarke, the former sheriff of Milwaukee County, Wisconsin, is the chair of CRC's American Law and Culture program. In 2017, the CRC launched the website "Influence Watch," which focuses on identifying funding sources of progressive organizations and initiatives, and of progressive politicians.

Publications and policy stances
CRC has been highly critical of animal rights activists and the environmental movement. In 2006, it published The Green Wave: Environmentalism and Its Consequences, a book by Bonner Cohen. In 2007, it published the third edition of The Great Philanthropists and the Problem of "Donor Intent" by Martin Morse Wooster, a senior fellow at the Center. In 2008, it published Guide to Nonprofit Advocacy, by James Dellinger. The CRC said Al Gore's campaign to control carbon emissions is motivated by the likelihood that he will make an "immense fortune" if laws are passed to control them, and has published authors who deny human influence in climate change. They have argued that organized labor is bad for America, and criticized government efforts to weaken intellectual property protection of prescription medications.

Film production
CRC has a film production arm called Dangerous Documentaries, which partially funded No Safe Spaces by Adam Carolla and radio host Dennis Prager, about political correctness on college campuses.

References

External links
 
 

Political and economic think tanks in the United States
Non-profit organizations based in Washington, D.C.
Think tanks established in 1984
Conservative organizations in the United States
1984 establishments in Washington, D.C.